The Icelandic women's national ice hockey team represents Iceland at the International Ice Hockey Federation's World Women's Ice Hockey Championship Division IIB.  The women's national team is controlled by Ice Hockey Iceland. As of 2011, Iceland had 71 female players. The Icelandic women's national team is ranked 29th in the world.

Olympic record
The Icelandic women's hockey team has never qualified for an Olympic tournament.

World Championships record
In 2005 the Icelandic Women team was the first time involved in the World Championship competition.
2005 – Finished in 30th place (4th in Division IV)
2007 – Finished in 32nd place (5th in Division IV)
2008 – Finished in 28th place (1st in Division IV, Promoted to Division III)
2009 – Division III canceled
2011 – Finished in 28th place (3rd in Division IV)
2012 – Finished in 30th place (4th in Division IIB)
2013 – Finished in 30th place (4th in Division IIB)
2014 – Finished in 30th place (4th in Division IIB)
2015 – Finished in 30th place (4th in Division IIB)
2016 – Finished in 29th place (3rd in Division IIB)
2017 – Finished in 30th place (4th in Division IIB)
2018 – Finished in 30th place (3rd in Division IIB)
2019 – Finished in 31st place (3rd in Division IIB)
2020 – Finished in 30th place (2nd in Division IIB)
2021 – Cancelled due to the COVID-19 pandemic
2022 – Finished in 27th place (1st in Division IIB)

All-time record against other nations
As of 14 September 2011

References

External links

IIHF profile
National Teams of Ice Hockey

Ice hockey
Women's national ice hockey teams in Europe